Achille Peretti (Alessandria 1857 – New Orleans 1923) was an Italian painter, sculptor and anarchist.

Biography 
During the 1870s, Peretti studied art in Milan at the Brera Academy under the direction of Giuseppe Bertini, Raffaele Casnedi, Luigi Riccardi, Luigi Bisi, and Antonio Caimi. In these years he gained a number of prizes; finally in the 1878 he obtained the "Menzione d'onore" in painting.

He became a member of the Alessandria local section of the First International, and was described by the police as a "fanatic internationalist" that wanted to overthrow the society in order to try benefits from the riots.

Achille emigrated to the United States following the repression in Italy of the First International and after having traveled through the Gulf Coast and Chicago decided to stay in New Orleans. He became a citizen in 1890 and from 1903 until his death lived at the 632 St Peter Street in the French Quarter. In the same house lived some years later the American playwright Tennessee Williams.

Selected works 
 Portrait of Hector Berlioz
 Portrait of an Elderly Lady
 The stampede, 1900
 Tree lined street
 Rooster and Chickens in the Barn
 Irish Channel Woman

References

Bibliography 
 Atti della Reale Accademia di belle arti di Milano, Vari, Milano, 1860-1894.
 Isaac Monroe Cline, Contemporary art and artists in New Orleans, 1924
 Federal Writers' Project, Louisiana: A Guide to the State, US History Publishers
 John Mahe, Encyclopedia of New Orleans Artists 1718-1918, Historic New Orleans, New Orleans, 1987
 Henry Rightor, Standard History of New Orleans, Louisiana, The Lewis Publishing Company, 1900

19th-century Italian painters
Italian male painters
20th-century Italian painters
19th-century Italian sculptors
Italian male sculptors
20th-century Italian sculptors
20th-century male artists
Italian anarchists
1923 deaths
1857 births
Brera Academy alumni
19th-century Italian male artists